The Ouachita shiner or Ouachita Mountain shiner (Lythrurus snelsoni) is a species of ray-finned fish in the family Cyprinidae.
It is found only in the upper Little River system in the Ouachita Mountains of Arkansas and Oklahoma in the United States.

References

Lythrurus
Ouachita Mountains
Fish described in 1985
Taxonomy articles created by Polbot